The 1992 Daily Mirror/Sporting Life Greyhound Derby took place during May and June with the final being held on 27 June 1992 at Wimbledon Stadium. The winner Farloe Melody received £40,000. The competition was sponsored by the Sporting Life and Daily Mirror.

Final result 
At Wimbledon (over 480 metres):

Distances 
3¾, head, neck, ½, 4¾ (lengths)
The distances between the greyhounds are in finishing order and shown in lengths. One length is equal to 0.08 of one second.

Competition Report
 The ante-post favourite for the 1992 Derby were Farloe Melody the double Irish Easter Cup champion, Dundalk International winner and Irish Greyhound Derby finalist owned by John Davis and Dave Tickner. Kennelmate Ardfert Mick was missing following his injury sustained in the Scottish Greyhound Derby final. The leading British runners were Puppy Derby champion and Juvenile winner Right Move trained by Nick Savva and John Copplestone’s Murlens Abbey.

During the qualifying and first round stages Parquet Pet recorded 28.79 and Murlens Abbey was just behind with a 28.82 win. Ringa Hustle, Sullane Castle, Gortmore Express and Dempsey Duke all claimed wins but Frost Hill was eliminated. In the second round Glengar Ranger and Ballyard Ryan both won in 28.60 and Luxury Light recorded 28.70 but Right Move was knocked over and Pall Mall Stakes champion Deanpark Atom was withdrawn. Frozen Problem and Dempsey Duke were two more high profile eliminations.

Dromin Fox won the first quarter-final followed by Murlens Abbey, Glengar Ranger and Ringa Hustle. Ballyard Ryan and Sullane Castle both failed to make the semi-finals. The semi-finals provided controversy in heat two when Farloe Melody passed the line first at 7-4f followed home by Siostalaoir and Pennys Best. Behind these Murlens Abbey and Ringa Hustle had encountered trouble with the connections of Murlens Abbey publicly criticising the rails seeding of Ringa Hustle as the reason that both greyhounds had been knocked out. Winsor Abbey claimed the earlier semi from Glengar Ranger and Gentle Warning.

In the final Farloe Melody drew his favoured trap six box for the first time and it resulted in an easy four length victory from Winsor Abbey who after a poor start ran on very strongly. Farloe Melody took a clear lead from Siostalaoir at the third bend after they were neck and neck until then. Trouble at the first bend ended the chances of Glengar Ranger and Gentle Warning.

Quarter finals

Semi finals

See also
1992 UK & Ireland Greyhound Racing Year

References

Greyhound Derby
English Greyhound Derby
English Greyhound Derby